Garry Kallos (born 5 March 1956) is a Canadian former wrestler who competed in the 1984 Summer Olympics and won five gold medals at the Maccabiah Games in Israel, and sambo competitor who won a gold medal at the Pan American Games.

Biography
Kallos was born in Budapest, Hungary, and resides in Montreal, Canada.  His parents were Holocaust survivors.

He attended Concordia University (Bachelor of Applied Science '80). Kallos competed in the 95+ kilo weight class at the Canadian Interuniversity Athletic Union championships, where he won the gold medal in 1978 and 1984. He was named to the Concordia University Sports Hall of Fame in 2002. 

From 1979-81, he won Canada's national freestyle championship.  In addition, from 1979-83, he was national Greco-Roman champion. 

He won a gold medal for Canada at 90 kg in Sambo at the 1983 Pan American Games in Caracas, Venezuela.

Kallos finished in 10th place in the light-heavyweight category in Men's Greco-Roman 90 kg at the 1984 Summer Olympics. He also qualified to represent Canada in the 1980 Summer Olympics in Moscow, in both Greco Roman and Freestyle.

Kallos is Jewish, and won five gold medals and a silver at the Maccabiah Games in Israel (1977 Maccabiah Games, 1981 Maccabiah Games (two gold medals), and 1985 Maccabiah Games). He was the Team Canada coach at the Maccabiah Games in 1993 and 1997.

References

External links
 

1956 births
Living people
Canadian male sport wrestlers
Competitors at the 1977 Maccabiah Games
Competitors at the 1981 Maccabiah Games
Competitors at the 1985 Maccabiah Games
Concordia Stingers players
Greco-Roman wrestlers
Jewish Canadian sportspeople
Jewish Hungarian sportspeople
Jewish wrestlers
Sport wrestlers from Budapest
Hungarian emigrants to Canada
Hungarian male sport wrestlers
Maccabiah Games gold medalists for Canada
Maccabiah Games silver medalists for Canada
Maccabiah Games medalists in wrestling
Olympic wrestlers of Canada
Sambo (martial art) practitioners
Sambokas at the 1983 Pan American Games
Wrestlers at the 1984 Summer Olympics
Pan American Games gold medalists for Canada
Medalists at the 1983 Pan American Games
20th-century Canadian people